William Louis Abbott (23 February 1860 – 2 April 1936) was an American medical doctor, explorer, ornithologist and field naturalist.  He compiled prodigious collections of biological specimens and ethnological artefacts from around the world, especially from Maritime Southeast Asia, and was a significant financial supporter of the United States National Museum collecting expeditions.

Early life and education

Abbot was born in Philadelphia.  He obtained a Bachelor of Arts at the University of Pennsylvania in 1881 before studying medicine there, graduating in 1884 and subsequently doing postgraduate studies in England, obtaining licentiates from the Royal College of Physicians and Royal College of Surgeons.  In 1886, he received a substantial inheritance, ceased the formal practice of medicine, and devoted himself to exploration and collecting.

Exploration and collecting expeditions
Journeys of exploration and collecting made by Abbott include:
 1880 – Bird collecting in Iowa and North Dakota
 1883 – Bird collecting in Cuba and Santo Domingo
 1887–89 – Taveta region, near Mount Kilimanjaro, in Kenya, East Africa
 1890 – Zanzibar, Seychelles and Madagascar
 1891 – India: Baltistan, Karachi, Kashmir and Srinagar
 1892 – Kashmir, Baltistan, Aden, Seychelles and the Aldabra Group
 1893 – Seychelles, Kashmir, Srinagar, Ladakh, Sinkiang and eastern Turkestan
 1894 – As well as travelling in eastern Turkestan, India and Ceylon, he went to Madagascar to enlist in the native "Hova" army against the second French occupation of the island, until local suspicion of foreigners forced his resignation
 1895 – Madagascar and Kashmir
 1896 – Malay Peninsula including Perak, Penang and Trang, with a visit to Canton
 1897 – Trang, Penang and India
 1898 – As well as volunteering for the Spanish–American War and serving under William A. Chanler in Cuba, where he was wounded in the Battle of Tayacoba, he traveled to Singapore and China, making a visit to Tibet
 1899 – Abbott constructed the schooner "Terrapin" and, using Singapore as a base for the next ten years, travelled throughout the islands of Maritime Southeast Asia often accompanied by Cecil Boden Kloss. Places visited include the Mergui Archipelago, Natuna Islands, the Andaman and Nicobar Islands, Burma, Malaya, Sumatra, Borneo, Nias, the Mentawai Islands, Enggano, the Riau Archipelago and islands in the South China and Java Seas.
 1909 – The onset of partial blindness, caused by spirochetosis, forced him to sell the "Terrapin" and largely suspend his collecting in the tropics. After treatment in Germany, from 1910 to 1915, he travelled in Kashmir, though making a brief collecting visit to the Maluku Islands and Sulawesi with his sister in 1914.
 1916 – Dominican Republic
 1917–18 – Haiti, where he suffered a near-fatal attack of dysentery
 1919–23 – Hispaniola

Post career
In 1923, Abbott retired from active fieldwork but continued to provide funding on several occasions to the United States National Museum for other collecting expeditions.

He died at his farm on the Elk River in Maryland of heart disease after a long illness, leaving his books, papers and 20% of his estate to the Smithsonian Institution.  At the time of his death he was the largest single contributor to the collections of the museum.  Abbott's name is commemorated in the names of numerous animal taxa, including those of Abbott's crested lizard (Gonocephalus abbotti ), Abbott's day gecko (Phelsuma abbotti ), Abbott's booby (Papasula abbotti), Abbott's starling (Cinnyricinclus femoralis), pygmy cuckoo-shrike (Coracina abbotti), Abbott's sunbird (Cinnyris sovimanga abbotti), the western grey gibbon (Hylobates abbotti) and Abbott's duiker (Cephalophus spadix).  Plants named after him include Cyathea abbottii, a tree-fern native to Hispaniola.

References

External links
 
William Louis Abbott Field Book, 1920-1923 from the Smithsonian Institution Archives

1860 births
1936 deaths
American ornithologists
American naturalists
American explorers
Physicians from Philadelphia
Philanthropists from Pennsylvania
University of Pennsylvania alumni
Smithsonian Institution donors
Perelman School of Medicine at the University of Pennsylvania alumni
Members of the Royal College of Physicians of Ireland